Changchow dialect may refer to:

Zhangzhou dialect, a Hokkien dialect spoken in and around Zhangzhou, Fujian, China
Changzhou dialect, a Wu dialect spoken in and around Changzhou, Jiangsu, China

See also
Changchow (disambiguation)